"Baby" is a song by British electronic music group Clean Bandit featuring Welsh singer Marina and Puerto Rican singer Luis Fonsi, released as the fifth single from Clean Bandit's second album, What Is Love?, on 2 November 2018.

"Baby" is Marina's first single where she is not credited as Marina and the Diamonds, a stage name she had used on prior releases. It is included on her fourth studio album, Love + Fear. A version without Fonsi appears on the album's vinyl release.

Composition
Baby is composed in the key  of C minor. Lyrically, the song deals with a love triangle, with the singer telling somebody that they are "already someone else's".

The song has a tempo of 117 beats per minute, and has a time signature of common time. It also features a complete descending circle of fifths, which propels the music forward throughout the circle of fifths and back to C minor.

Promotion
On 29 October 2018, the group announced the release on Twitter and shared its cover art. On 2 November 2018, the group performed on BBC Two's Strictly Come Dancing: It Takes Two.

Critical reception
Mike Wass of Idolator called the preview of the song a "sultry banger that already sounds like a hit", saying Marina "coos" the line "But I'm already someone else's baby" over Clean Bandit's "seductive, Latin-tinged house beats". Billboard labelled "Baby" a "flamenco-infused track", opining that Fonsi's verse in Spanish provides it with a "distinctive Latin flare".

Music video
Clean Bandit also released the video on YouTube on 2 November 2018. The video features Fonsi, Marina, Grace Chatto, and Australian singer Starley. Chatto portrays an unnamed bride who marries Fonsi's character as it is revealed via flashbacks that she had a thwarted relationship with another woman — now a wedding guest — while attending summer camp.

Track listing
Digital download
"Baby" – 3:25

Digital download – acoustic
"Baby"  – 3:37

Digital download – remixes
"Baby"  – 3:02
"Baby"  – 3:28

Charts

Weekly charts

Year-end charts

Certifications

Release history

References

2018 singles
2018 songs
Clean Bandit songs
Luis Fonsi songs
Marina Diamandis songs
Number-one singles in Israel
Songs written by Kamille (musician)
Songs written by Jack Patterson (Clean Bandit)
Songs written by Jason Evigan
Songs written by Luis Fonsi
Songs written by Marina Diamandis
Song recordings produced by Mark Ralph (record producer)